Caldera is a corregimiento in Boquete District, Chiriquí Province, Panama. Its population as of 1990 was 1,175; its population as of 2000 was 1,204.

References

Corregimientos of Chiriquí Province